This is a list of yearly Big West Conference football standings.

Big West standings

Pacific Coast Athletic Association standings (1969–1987)

Big West Conference standings (1988–2000)

References

Big West Conference
Standings